Irina Fetisova may refer to:

 Irina Fetisova (swimmer and rower) (born 1956), Soviet female swimmer and rower
 Irina Fetisova (volleyball) (born 1994), Russian female volleyball player